Marisol Castillo Aragones-Sampelo (born November 6, 1977) is a Filipina politician who served as the Representative of Laguna's 3rd district from 2013 to 2022. Before entering politics, she was a news presenter for ABS-CBN from 1998 to 2012.

Early life and education
She was born on November 6, 1977 in San Pablo, Laguna, to a simple family. Her father is a tricycle driver.

She attended secondary school in Canossa College in San Pablo, Laguna, where she was a student leader. Her political rival, Evita Arago, also attended the same school.

After High School, she went on to the College of Development Communication at the University of the Philippines Los Baños, earning a bachelor's degree in Development Communication, with a major in Community Broadcasting, in 1998.

Career

Journalism
After her graduation, she joined ABS-CBN as news reporter, with her last day being September 17, 2012. She also worked as a radio anchor for DZMM until September 21, 2012.

She started as a writer in Hoy Gising!, eventually becoming a reporter therein. She was the segment host for Salamat Dok, reflecting her passion for providing basic health services and education to the public. She has also been a segment host (Bargain Lady) in Alas Singko Y Medya, segment producer for Verum EST: Totoo Ba Ito? and True Crime, and co-host of the documentary Kalye with Anthony Taberna and Atom Araullo. She was the anchor for Nagbabagang Balita (breaking/hourly news) and DZMM's S.R.O. - Suhestyon, Reaksyon at Opinyon. She was also the Senior Reporter for TV Patrol, Bandila and Umagang Kay Ganda.

Her work was recognized through the following awards: best field reporter of the UPLB Gandingan Award in 2006, Distinguished Alumna Award in Media Practice by UP in 2009, Outstanding San Pableños Award in May 2010 and best field reporter in the 2011 Communication Guild (Comguild) Awards.

Politics
She joined the United Nationalist Alliance of former president Joseph Estrada and Vice President Jejomar Binay. In 2013, she ran for congress in her home province of Laguna. Her allies include erstwhile provincial governor ER Ejercito and board member Angelica Alarva. She won against her rival, Arago, by more than 10,000 votes.

In the 2022 elections, she ran for governor of Laguna but lost to incumbent governor Ramil Hernandez.

Advocacy
Aragones' advocacies are the provision of education, health services and livelihood opportunities for all. Since the opening of the 16th Congress, she has filed House Bills according to her advocacies which include the Teen Pregnancy Prevention, Responsibility and Opportunity Act, the Pregnant Women's Protection Act, and the Sexual Orientation or Gender Identity Discrimination Prohibition Act.

References

1977 births
Living people
Filipino journalists
Members of the House of Representatives of the Philippines from Laguna (province)
Nacionalista Party politicians
People from San Pablo, Laguna
United Nationalist Alliance politicians
PDP–Laban politicians
University of the Philippines Los Baños alumni
ABS-CBN News and Current Affairs people
Women members of the House of Representatives of the Philippines
21st-century Filipino women politicians
21st-century Filipino politicians